Hannah Lawrance (1795 – 20 November 1875, Barnsbury Park, Middlesex) was an English historian and journalist.

Lawrance contributed articles to Household Words and Blackwood's Magazine and reviewed historical works for The Athenaeum. For Hood's Magazine she wrote "historical tales set in various periods of English history".

She is famous for her two books Historical Memoirs of the Queens of England, from the Commencement of the Twelfth Century (1838) and The History of Woman in England, and Her Influence on Society and Literature, from the Earliest Period (1843). The two histories "not only rediscovered the lives of medieval women, but also emphasized the significance of women's patronage to the development of British culture."

She advocated equal education for women and argued for a favourable view of the intelligence and activity of the women in England's medieval convents.

Hannah Lawrance is one of eight critics dealt with in the book Women Reviewing Women in Nineteenth-Century Britain by Joanne Wilkes.

Selected publications

References

1795 births
1875 deaths
19th-century English women writers
19th-century English historians
19th-century British journalists
British women historians
Feminism and history
People from the London Borough of Islington
Victorian women writers